Weidenhahn is an Ortsgemeinde – a community belonging to a Verbandsgemeinde – in the Westerwaldkreis in Rhineland-Palatinate, Germany.

Geography

The community lies 7 km northeast of Selters at the junction of Weidenbach and Steinchesbach. The community belongs to the Verbandsgemeinde of Selters, a kind of collective municipality. Its seat is in the like-named town.

History
About 1200, Weidenhahn was first mentioned under the name Weidenhagen. Other names that it has had over time are Weidenhayn, Wedinhane, Weidinhan, Weidenhayn and Weidenhahn.

Politics

The municipal council is made up of 16 council members, as well as the honorary and presiding mayor (Ortsbürgermeister), who were elected in a municipal election on 13 June 2004.

Seat apportionment on council:

Economy and infrastructure

The community lies west of Bundesstraße 8, leading from Limburg an der Lahn to Siegburg. The nearest InterCityExpress stop is the railway station at Montabaur on the Cologne-Frankfurt high-speed rail line.

References

External links
Weidenhahn 
Verbandsgemeinde of Selters 

Municipalities in Rhineland-Palatinate
Westerwaldkreis